Abbas Tufarqanlı or Abbas Divarganli, or Abbas of Tufargan, was a 17th-century Azerbaijani ashik. He is regarded as one of the most prominent of all times.

Abbas Tufarqanlı was born in late 16th century in Azarshahr, a town near Tabriz which was known as Tufarqan.  His biography is shrouded in the background of the folk story, Abbas and Gülgez set in the court of Safavid Shah Abbas (1587–1629), where Ashik Abbas quests to win his beloved Gülgez away from the king. Abbas achieves his goal by convincing the ruler that he (Ashik Abbas) was a divinely inspired ashik. This episode is a renowned instance of dream motif in Turkish hikaye.

Abbas Tufarqanlı's compositions
Abbas was a great composer and some of his compositions  have survived and are still song by contemporary ashiks. A famous song is the following:

References

16th-century Iranian poets
Azerbaijani-language poets
People from Azarshahr
17th-century Iranian poets